Partapur is now turn into nagerpalika in Banswara district in the Indian state of Rajasthan. It is a fast growing area in the Wagad region and the second largest populated city in the Banswara district.

Geography 
It has an average elevation of 164 metres (538 feet).

About 
Partapur is the largest city after Banswara in the Banswara district which is a part of the Wagad area in Rajasthan. Wagari is the local dialect of people staying in Partapur and surrounding areas. 
Partapur has turned into a nager palika after merger of nearby villages like Garhi, Nawagoun, Dhani, Bedwa,  four Mosques.
Galiakot and Banswara are the two nearby religious places for the Bohras.
and another two river sangam of Mahi and Chap rivers in nearest village Chaupasag.The modern city of Rajasthan has many distinct neighbourhoods. Since the 1990s a number of landmark integrated townships and gated communities have been developed in Partapur such as RIICO, New colony,tti, Partapur has a tropical wet and dry (Köppen Aw) climate, closely bordering upon a hot semi-arid climate (Köppen BSh) with average temperatures ranging between 20 and 28 °C (68 and 82 °F).[100] partapur experiences three seasons: summer, monsoon, and winter. Typical summer months are from mid-March to mid-June, with maximum temperatures sometimes reaching 42 °C (108 °F). The warmest month in partapur is May. The city often has heavy dusty winds in May, with humidity remaining high. Even during the hottest months, the nights are usually cool due to Partapur's high altitude. The highest temperature recorded was 43.3 °C (109.9 °F) on 30 April 1897.[101]

The monsoon lasts from June to October, with moderate rainfall and temperatures ranging from 22 to 28 °C (72 to 82 °F). Most of the 722 mm (28.43 in) of annual rainfall in the city falls between June and September, and July is the wettest month of the year. Hailstorms are not unheard of. For most of December and January the daytime temperature hovers around 29 °C (84.2 °F) while overnight temperatures are below 12 °C (53.6 °F). The lowest temperature recorded was 1.7 °C (35.1 °F). Public buses within the city and its suburbs are operated by rajasthan governments ,Healthcare in the government hospital is provided by private and public facilities. Primary care is provided by practitioners of scientific medicine as well as traditional and alternative medicine (i.e. Ayurved, Homeopathy and Unani). For minor and chronic ailments, people in the region often rely on practitioners of traditional medicine. partapur is famous for food & restaurant like- foodies restaurant ,hungerland restaurant ,siri restaurant, Fakhri Resort, kgf Restaurant, Hotel Royal Inn, Aashirwad Vatika, Khana Khazana Partapur Bedwa and Aala Restaurant.

Demographics 
 India census, Partapur had a population of 43,655. After merged with the nearby places partapur became a Municipal council with the current population of 43,655. Males constitute 53% of the population and females 47%. Partapur has an average literacy rate of 70%, higher than the national average of 59.5%: male literacy is 77%, and female literacy is 63%.  In Partapur, 14% of the population is under 6 years of age.

Transport 
Nearest International Airport -SVBP International Airport,Ahemdabad
240 km
Devi Ahilyabai Holkar International Airport,Indore 255 km.
Nearest Domestic Airport-Maharana Pratap Airport,Udaipur  135 km.
Nearest Railway station - Dungarpur Junction 70km,Udaipur Junction 135km,Ratlam Junction 115km. ,Dahod 107 km

Partapur are connected via bus to major or minor cities of Rajasthan, Gujrat,Madhyapradesh and other states.
Area code for telephone is 0091-2963
Zip Code - 327024

References 

Cities and towns in Banswara district